RIHS may stand for:

 Reading Intermediate High School, a school in Reading, Pennsylvania
 Rhode Island Historical Society, an organization dedicated to the history of Rhode Island
 Rock Island High School, a high school in Rock Island, Illinois
 Society of the Revival of Islamic Heritage, a Kuwait-based non-governmental organization
 RIHS F.C., a former association football Bhutanese club